Bluenote Café is a live album by Canadian / American singer-songwriter Neil Young, released on November 13, 2015, on Reprise. The album is volume eleven in Young's Archives Performance Series, and features performances from Young's 1987–88 American tours with the Bluenotes, with whom he recorded his seventeenth studio album, This Note's for You.

Aside from live versions of This Note's for You songs, the album features a number of songs that were not released at the time; "Welcome to the Big Room", "Bad News Comes to Town", "Crime of the Heart" and "Doghouse" make their first appearances on any official Neil Young release ("Doghouse" was covered in 2011 by Young's then-wife Pegi on her album Bracing for Impact). Two of the album's tracks, "This Note's for You" and "Ain't It the Truth," previously appeared on the compilation album Lucky Thirteen.

Critical reception

The album received positive reviews, and holds a score of 75 out of 100 on Metacritic, indicating "generally favourable reviews". Chris Gerard of PopMatters gave the album nine stars out of ten, stating: "Bluenote Café is essential Neil Young, further evidence that Young's 80s work has more value than many would expect or admit." Conversely, in a brief negative review, Daniel Sylvester of Exclaim! wrote that "even die-hard fans will find this as nothing more than a masochistic curiosity." In a three-star review, Will Hermes of Rolling Stone said that "[these] live recordings from the late Eighties illuminate and (partly) redeem one of Neil Young's stranger eras". In a highly positive four-and-a-half-star review, Hal Horowitz of American Songwriter wrote that "even diehard Neil Young fans may not fully appreciate this offshoot in his bulging catalog. But this remarkably vibrant and immediate live compilation shows that Young took this side road very seriously and it was more than just a forgettable, momentary quirk in his diverse and winding career."

Track listing
Disc 1
 "Welcome to the Big Room" (Recorded on location at Mountain View Theater, Mountain View, California – 1987-11-07) – 7:31
 "Don't Take Your Love Away From Me" (The Fillmore, San Francisco, California – 1987-11-12) – 9:30
 "This Note's for You" (The Palace, Hollywood, CA – 1988-04-13) – 5:24
 "Ten Men Workin'" (The World, New York City, New York – 1988-04-18) – 8:27
 "Life in the City" (The World, New York City, New York – 1988-04-18) – 3:55
 "Hello Lonely Woman" (The World, New York City, New York – 1988-04-18) – 4:46
 "Soul of a Woman" (The World, New York City, New York – 1988-04-18) – 5:57
 "Married Man" (The World, New York City, New York – 1988-04-21) – 3:07
 "Bad News Comes to Town" (Agora Ballroom, Cleveland, Ohio – 1988-04-23) – 8:00
 "Ain't It the Truth" (Agora Ballroom, Cleveland, Ohio – 1988-04-23) – 7:30
 "One Thing" (Agora Ballroom, Cleveland, Ohio – 1988-04-23) – 6:41
 "Twilight" (Agora Ballroom, Cleveland, Ohio – 1988-04-23) – 8:03
Disc 2

"I'm Goin'" (CNE, Toronto, Ontario, Canada – 1988-08-18) – 5:35
 "Ordinary People" (Lake Compounce, Bristol, Connecticut – 1988-08-23) – 12:50
 "Crime in the City" (Jones Beach, Wantagh, New York – 1988-08-27) – 7:22
 "Crime of the Heart" (Pier 84, New York City, New York – 1988-08-30) – 5:36
 "Welcome Rap" (Pier 84, New York City, New York – 1988-08-30) – 0:36
 "Doghouse" (Pier 84, New York City, New York – 1988-08-30) – 4:08
 "Fool for Your Love" (Pier 84, New York City, New York – 1988-08-30) – 4:20
 "Encore Rap" (Pier 84, New York City, New York – 1988-08-30) – 0:25
 "On the Way Home" (Poplar Creek Music Theatre, Hoffman Estates, Illinois – 1988-08-16) – 3:01
 "Sunny Inside" (Pier 84, New York City, New York – 1988-08-30) – 3:44
 "Tonight's the Night" (Pier 84, New York City, New York – 1988-08-30) – 19:26

Personnel
Neil Young – vocals, guitar, harmonica
Rick Rosas – bass (except disc 1: tracks 1–2)
Chad Cromwell – drums (except disc 1: tracks 1–2)
Frank Sampedro – keyboards, guitar, backing vocals
Steve Lawrence – lead tenor saxophone, keyboards, backing vocals
Ben Keith – alto saxophone
Larry Cragg – baritone saxophone
Claude Cailliet – trombone, backing vocals
Tom Bray – trumpet
John Fumo – trumpet
Billy Talbot – bass (disc 1: tracks 1–2 only)
Ralph Molina – drums (disc 1: tracks 1–2 only)

Charts

References

External links 
 Pop Matters## album review
 Ultimate Classic Rock album review

2015 live albums
Neil Young live albums
Reprise Records live albums